Bloomfield is a city in northeastern San Juan County, New Mexico, United States. It is part of the Farmington Metropolitan Statistical Area. The population was 8,112 at the 2010 census.

It is on the Trails of the Ancients Byway, one of the designated New Mexico Scenic Byways.

Geography
Bloomfield is located at  (36.710722, -107.982668).

Demographics

As of the census of 2000, there were 6,417 people, 2,222 households, and 1,708 families residing in the city. The population density was 1,280.7 people per square mile (494.5/km). There were 2,446 housing units at an average density of 488.2 per square mile (188.5/km). The racial makeup of the city was 62.38% White, 0.33% African American, 16.71% Native American, 0.34% Asian, 0.06% Pacific Islander, 15.96% from other races, and 4.22% from two or more races. Hispanic or Latino of any race were 27.51% of the population.

There were 2,222 households, out of which 42.6% had children under the age of 18 living with them, 55.9% were married couples living together, 15.5% had a female householder with no husband present, and 23.1% were non-families. 19.7% of all households were made up of individuals, and 7.4% had someone living alone who was 65 years of age or older. The average household size was 2.85 and the average family size was 3.26.

In the city, the population was spread out, with 32.4% under the age of 18, 9.7% from 18 to 24, 27.0% from 25 to 44, 20.9% from 45 to 64, and 10.0% who were 65 years of age or older. The median age was 31 years. For every 100 females, there were 91.4 males. For every 100 females age 18 and over, there were 89.5 males.

The median income for a household in the city was $32,905, and the median income for a family was $34,760. Males had a median income of $29,144 versus $19,203 for females. The per capita income for the city was $14,424. About 15.2% of families and 14.7% of the population were below the poverty line, including 18.5% of those under age 18 and 13.6% of those age 65 or over.

Education
Most of the city of Bloomfield and rural areas in eastern/southeastern San Juan County are served by Bloomfield Schools. Bloomfield High School is the local high school.

A portion of northern Bloomfield is zoned to Aztec Municipal Schools. Aztec High School is the local high school of that section.

Until 1956 all students from Bloomfield went to Aztec High. In 1956 Bloomfield High formed out of the town's junior high school.

Points of interest 
The Salmon Ruins pueblo and museum are located just to the west of the city along Highway 64. The ruins are the remains of a 12th-century Anasazi village. The ruins, as well as the homestead of George Salmon are open to the public.

Government
Bloomfield's government consists of four council members elected at large and a mayor. Members of the City Council serve with minimal financial compensation. The current mayor of Bloomfield is Cynthia Atencio.

Felix v. City of Bloomfield 

In April 2007, Bloomfield attracted attention and some controversy when the city council voted unanimously to erect a stone monument of the Ten Commandments at the city hall. Two residents sued the city in 2012 "alleging it violated their constitutional rights and represented a government endorsement of religion". In August 2014, a federal judge ruled the monument must be removed. The city's response to the lawsuit was that it was a local group that paid for the memorial and they had added a disclaimer. A district judge decided that a "reasonable observer would interpret the monument as the government endorsing a religion". The ACLU became involved and the city asked the Supreme Court to hear the case, but was refused. The city owed court fees of $700,000 to the ACLU and the monument was moved to "property owned by a Baptist church. The city has been looking for outside funds to pay the fee, but in June 2018 it released its 2019 budget which calls for "paying $233,000 toward the money it owes from the ... lawsuit". The city has until 2021 to pay the amount in full. Hemant Mehta stated that the "city officials were goaded by the Christian Right into fighting back. "

See also

 List of cities in New Mexico

References

External links

 City of Bloomfield
 Bloomfield Chamber of Commerce

Cities in New Mexico
Cities in San Juan County, New Mexico